Theren Churchill (born October 12, 1994) is a professional Canadian football offensive lineman for the Toronto Argonauts of the Canadian Football League (CFL).

Amateur career

Edmonton Huskies
After finishing high school, Churchill played for the Edmonton Huskies of the Canadian Junior Football League for four years. He was named a Prairie Football Conference All-Star in 2016.

Regina Rams
Churchill joined the Regina Rams of U Sports football in 2017 and immediately became the team's starting right tackle. In his three seasons with the Rams, he started all 24 regular season games, and one post-season game in 2017, all at right tackle.

Professional career
Churchill was drafted in the first round, ninth overall, in the 2020 CFL Draft by the Toronto Argonauts, but did not play in 2020 due to the cancellation of the 2020 CFL season. He then signed with the team on March 22, 2021. Churchill began the 2021 season on the practice roster, but was promoted to the active roster in week 6 and made his professional debut on September 10, 2021, against the Hamilton Tiger-Cats. He dressed in the remaining ten games of the regular season and made his first start in the last game of the regular season against the Edmonton Elks on November 16, 2021.

Personal life
Churchill first played ice hockey when he was five or six years old and then started playing gridiron football when he was nine or ten years old.

References

External links
Toronto Argonauts bio 

1994 births
Living people
Canadian football offensive linemen
Canadian Junior Football League players
People from the County of Stettler No. 6
Players of Canadian football from Alberta
Regina Rams players
Toronto Argonauts players